This is the list of Russian microprocessors, sorted by manufacturer

MCST
 Elbrus 2000 – implements VLIW architecture, 300 MHz clock rate, developed by MCST
 Elbrus-S
 Elbrus-1S+ – single-core evolution of Elbrus 2000 SoC, 1000 MHz clock rate + GPU
 Elbrus-2S+ – dual-core evolution of Elbrus 2000, 500 MHz clock rate + four DSP cores (ELcore-09)
 Elbrus-2SM – dual-core evolution of Elbrus 2000, 300 MHz clock rate
 Elbrus-4S – quad-core evolution of Elbrus 2000, 800 MHz clock rate
 Elbrus-8S – octa-core evolution of Elbrus 2000, 1.3 GHz clock rate
 MCST-R150
 MCST-R500
 MCST-R500S – SPARC V8 dual-core 500 MHz
 MCST-R1000 – SPARC V9 quad-core 1 GHz
 MCST-4R – 64-bit, 4-core, 2w in-order superscalar, implements SPARC V9 instruction set architecture (ISA), 1000 MHz clock rate, developed by MCST

ELVEES
 ELVEES Multicore – multicore hybrid of RISC and DSP
 1892VM3T, (Russian: 1892ВМ3Т (MC-12)) – 1 RISC core + 1 DSP core ELcore-14
 1892VM2Ya, (Russian: 1892ВМ2Я (MC-24)) – 1 RISC core + 1 DSP ELcore-24
 1892VM5Ya, (Russian: 1892ВМ5Я (МС-0226, ЦПОС-02)) – 1 RISC core + 2 DSP cores (ELcore-26)
 1892VM4Ya, (Russian: 1892ВМ4Я (MC-0226G, МЦОС)) – 1 RISC core + 2 DSP cores (ELcore-26)
 NVCom-01
 NVCom-02 in versions 1892VM11Ya (1892ВМ11Я, NVCom-02) and 1892VM2Ya (1892ВМ10Я, NVCom-02T)

NIISI
 KOMDIV-32 – 32-bit, implements the MIPS I instruction set architecture (ISA), compatible with MIPS R3000, 90 MHz clock rate
 KOMDIV-64 (1890VM5) – 64-bit, 2-way in-order superscalar, implements the MIPS IV instruction set architecture (ISA), 350 MHz clock rate
 KOMDIV128-RIO – coprocessor

NTC Module
 NeuroMatrix – digital signal processor (DSP) series
 NM6403 – dual-core microprocessor VLIW/SIMD architecture, two main units of 32-bit RISC and 64-bit vector co-processor.
 NM6404
 NMC – 64-bit RISC/DSP
 NMRC – 32/64-bit RISC

Multiclet – post von Neumann, multicellular microprocessor
 MultiClet P1 – multicellular
 MultiClet R1 – multicellular, dynamically reconfigurable

Baikal Electronics
 Baikal T1 – dual-core MIPS32, 1.2 GHz clock rate

See also
 List of Soviet microprocessors

Lists of microprocessors
Microprocessors